Anderson Historic District, Anderson Downtown Historic District, or variations, may refer to:

 Anderson Place Historic District, Birmingham, Alabama, listed on the National Register of Historic Places
 Anderson Downtown Historic District (Anderson, Indiana)
 Larz Anderson Park Historic District, Boston, Massachusetts
 Anderson College Historic District, Anderson, South Carolina
 Anderson Downtown Historic District (Anderson, South Carolina)
 Anderson Historic District (Anderson, South Carolina)
 North Anderson Historic District, Anderson, South Carolina
 Anderson Historic District (Anderson, Texas)
 Anderson Hollow Archaeological District, Lexington, Virginia
 Anderson Dock Historic District, Ephraim, Wisconsin, listed on the National Register of Historic Places